Frankie, stylized as FRANKIE, is an American indie pop musician from Los Angeles, California.

Career
Frankie released her debut EP in 2015 titled Dreamstate via RCA Records. On October 6, 2015, Taylor Swift tweeted an image of a list titled "New Songs That Will Make Your Life More Awesome", with Frankie's "New Obsession" one of the eleven featured on the list.

Frankie is currently working on her debut studio album, which was predicted to be released via RCA in September 2018, but has not been released yet. In early 2017 she joined Daya as support on a US tour.

Discography

Extended plays

Singles

Tours
Supporting
 Troye Sivan - Suburbia Tour (2016) 
 Daya - Sit Still, Look Pretty Tour (2017)

References

Musicians from Los Angeles
American indie pop musicians
RCA Records artists